Isaac Sinkot (born 11 July 1954) is a Cameroonian former footballer. He competed in the men's tournament at the 1984 Summer Olympics.

References

External links
 

1954 births
Living people
Cameroonian footballers
Cameroon international footballers
Olympic footballers of Cameroon
Footballers at the 1984 Summer Olympics
1984 African Cup of Nations players
1986 African Cup of Nations players
Africa Cup of Nations-winning players
Place of birth missing (living people)
Association football defenders